Kirk Edward Herbstreit (born August 19, 1969) is an American sportscaster and former college football player. He serves as an analyst for ESPN's College GameDay, a television program covering college football, and provides color commentary on college football games on ESPN and ABC and Thursday night NFL games on Prime Video.  For his TV work, Herbstreit has won five Sports Emmy Awards in various categories. He appeared annually as a commentator in EA Sports' NCAA Football video game until the series was put on hiatus following NCAA Football 14.

From 1989 to 1993, Herbstreit was a quarterback for the Ohio State football team. He played in several games his junior season and was the starting quarterback throughout his senior season.

Playing career and subsequent activities in Ohio
Herbstreit graduated from Centerville High School in Centerville, Ohio, a suburb of Dayton. As a quarterback for the Elks, he was the Ohio Gatorade Player of the Year as a senior. He also was a standout basketball and baseball player.

Herbstreit was the first player to commit to the Ohio State Buckeyes after the hiring of John Cooper as head coach in 1988. Herbstreit was a four-year letterman as a quarterback at Ohio State University from 1989 to 1993. After waiting his turn behind Greg Frey and Kent Graham, Herbstreit finally led the team as a senior in 1992. That year, he was a co-captain (along with linebacker Steve Tovar) and voted team MVP. Herbstreit passed for 1,904 yards that season, including four 200-plus-yard games, before losing to the Georgia Bulldogs in the Florida Citrus Bowl. Herbstreit set the Ohio State record for pass completions (28) in the rivalry game against Michigan, throwing for 271 yards in a 13–13 tie in 1992. The record stood until 2006, when it was broken by Heisman Trophy winner Troy Smith. Herbstreit graduated from Ohio State in 1993 with a degree in business administration.

Herbstreit's father, Jim Herbstreit, was a co-captain (along with offensive tackle Jim Tyrer) of the 1960 Ohio State team, and later an assistant coach at Ohio State under Woody Hayes. When Herbstreit was named co-captain in 1992, the two became only the second father-and-son duo to have each been Ohio State captains. (James and Jeff Davidson were the first in 1989; Pepper and Dionte Johnson became the third in 2007.)

He also is known for a 2009 case in which he sued the IRS for changing an implied policy of allowing deductions for house donations to the fire department for training purposes.

Herbstreit is actively involved in multiple charities including the Buckeye Cruise for Cancer and The Make A Wish Foundation Ultimate Sports Auction.

He has lent his name to the Kirk Herbstreit National Kickoff Classic in Columbus, Ohio, and Arlington, Texas. According to the website, the Kickoff Classic "pits high school teams from the states of Ohio and Texas against prep football powerhouses from across the nation" over the Labor Day weekend. The games in Ohio are usually held at Ohio Stadium, while the games in Texas are held at AT&T Stadium.

Broadcasting career
Herbstreit joined ESPN in 1996, and has since gained roles as lead analyst on College GameDay with host Rece Davis, Desmond Howard, David Pollack, and Lee Corso. He serves as the analyst for ABC’s Saturday college football primetime games alongside former GameDay host and longtime colleague Chris Fowler.

Herbstreit was nominated for a 1997 Sports Emmy Award as television's top studio analyst and wrote a weekly in-season column, "Inside The Game With Kirk Herbstreit," for The Sporting News.

A frequent contributor to ESPN.com and ESPN The Magazine, Herbstreit has worked as a color commentator for ESPN's Thursday night college football games.

In July 2007, Herbstreit served as a panelist for the series Who's Now alongside Keyshawn Johnson and Michael Wilbon. 

Herbstreit contributes to the 97.1 The Fan, an ESPN Radio affiliate out of Columbus, Ohio.

In 2018, Herbstreit was announced to replace Jon Gruden for night one of ESPN’s NFL Draft coverage, as Gruden left to return to the then-Oakland, now Las Vegas Raiders. When ABC picked up rights to air the first two nights of the Draft, Herbstreit moved to ABC’s coverage with his GameDay colleagues.

In 2020, Herbstreit announced the first game of the Monday Night Football Kickoff Week doubleheader alongside Chris Fowler. A week later, Herbstreit and Rece Davis worked a special Monday Night Football MegaCast on ESPN2 for the Saints–Raiders game, the first ever NFL game to be played in Las Vegas, on the night in which Monday Night Football celebrated its 50th anniversary. In 2022, Fowler and Herbstreit again called the first game of an MNF doubleheader, this time during the final week of the 2021 season.

On March 23, 2022, Herbstreit was announced as the new color commentator for Thursday Night Football on Prime Video, alongside NFL play-by-play announcer Al Michaels. That same day, Herbstreit agreed to an extension of his contract with ESPN to allow him to continue on GameDay, Saturday Night Football, and the NFL Draft, to go along with his new NFL duties for Amazon.

Personal life
Herbstreit met his wife Alison at Ohio State, where she was a cheerleader. They were married in 1998 and have four sons. The Herbstreits moved from Ohio to Nashville in 2011, but now split  time between there and Cincinnati where their youngest son, Chase, plays quarterback for St. Xavier High School.
 His twin sons, Jake and Tye, were athletes at Montgomery Bell Academy. Tye now plays football as a walk-on at Clemson University; Jake walked on at Clemson before transferring to Ohio State to focus on academics. Herbstreit has another son, Zak, who joined the Ohio State football team as a preferred walk-on in 2021, as a tight end.

Kirk is a foodie and loves Jeff Ruby's Steakhouses. His hobbies include playing EA Sports video games, fishing, and working out. Herbstreit is a horse racing fan, and also follows Ohio sports teams like the Cincinnati Bengals, Columbus Blue Jackets, and Cincinnati Reds. Herbstreit was featured prominently in How We Lookin'?, a documentary about the life and career of longtime Reds broadcaster Marty Brennaman. He also loves spending time with his golden retrievers.

Awards and honors
Five-time Sports Emmy Award winner 
Three Outstanding Studio Analyst (2010, 2011, 2019)
Two Outstanding Event Analyst (2018, 2020)

References

External links

 

1969 births
Living people
American football quarterbacks
American sports radio personalities
American television sports announcers
Arena football announcers
College football announcers
ESPN people
Ohio State Buckeyes football players
Sportspeople from Columbus, Ohio
Sportspeople from Dayton, Ohio
Disney people
Players of American football from Columbus, Ohio
Players of American football from Dayton, Ohio